This article contains information about the literary events and publications of 1726.

Events
February – Lavinia Fenton makes her stage debut as Monimia in Thomas Otway's The Orphan at the Haymarket Theatre in London.
April 5 – Publication takes place in London of Lewis Theobald's Shakespeare Restored, or A Specimen of the Many Errors As Well Committed as Unamended by Mr Pope in his Late Edition of this Poet; Designed Not only to correct the said Edition, but to restore the True Reading of Shakespeare in all the Editions ever yet published.
May 10 – Voltaire leaves France for a three-year stay in Britain.
May 25 – Britain's first circulating library is opened in Edinburgh by the poet and bookseller Allan Ramsay. 
July – Françoise-Louise de Warens converts to Catholicism to receive a church pension, and annuls her marriage.
October 28 – Jonathan Swift's satirical novel Gulliver's Travels is published in London, anonymously in two volumes, as Travels into Several Remote Nations of the World. In Four Parts. By Lemuel Gulliver, First a Surgeon, and then a Captain of Several Ships. It sells out in a week.
unknown dates
The Teatro Valle opens in Rome.
The Gujin Tushu Jicheng (古今圖書集成), an immense Chinese encyclopedia, is printed using copper-based movable type printing.

New books

Fiction
Penelope Aubin – The Life and Adventures of the Lady Lucy (novel)
Jane Barker – The Lining of the Patch-Work Screen (sequel to 1723's A Patch-Work Screen)
William Rufus Chetwood – The Voyages and Adventures of Captain Robert Boyle (fiction, sometimes attributed to Daniel Defoe)
Eliza Haywood
The City Jilt
The Mercenary Lover
Jonathan Swift
Gulliver's Travels
Cadenus and Vanessa
Lewis Theobald – Shakespeare Restored
José Francisco de Isla – Papeles critico-apologéticos
Diego de Torres Villarroel – El ermitaño y Torres
Martín Sarmiento – Reflexiones sobre el Diccionario de la lengua castellana que compuso la Real Academia en el año de 1726

Drama
Venkata Ajapura – Mairavana Kalaga
Aaron Hill – The Fatal Extravagance (printed, staged in 1721)
 Charles Johnson – The Female Fortune Teller
Thomas Southerne – Money the Mistress
Leonard Welsted – The Dissembled Wanton
Richard West – Hecuba

Poetry

Alexander Pope – The Odyssey of Homer
Richard Savage – Miscellaneous Poems
William Somervile – Occasional Poems
Jonathan Swift (anonymously) – Cadenus and Vanessa (written 1713)
James Thomson – Winter (part of The Four Seasons)

Non-fiction
John Balguy – A letter to a Deist concerning the Beauty and Excellency of Moral Virtue, and the Support and Improvement which it receives from the Christian Religion
Joseph Butler – Fifteen Sermons
Anthony Collins – The Scheme of Literal Prophecy
Corporate authorship – The Craftsman (periodical associated with Henry St. John)
Daniel Defoe
The Political History of the Devil
A System of Magick
John Dennis – The Stage Defended (reply to Law, below)
William Law
The Absolute Unlawfulness of the Stage
A Practical Treatise upon Christian Perfection
Samuel Penhallow – History of the Wars of New-England with the Eastern Indians
William Penn
Fruits of a Father's Love
A Collection of the Works of William Penn
(with William Pulteney) – The Discovery
George Shelvocke – A Voyage Round the World by Way of the Great South Sea
Joseph Spence – An Essay on Pope's Odyssey

Births
March 11 – Louise d'Épinay, French writer (died 1783)
April 7 – Charles Burney, English historian of music and composer (died 1814)
June 14 – Thomas Pennant, Welsh naturalist and writer (died 1798)
September 2 – John Howard, English philanthropist and writer (died 1790)
September 25 – Angelo Maria Bandini, Italian author and librarian (died 1800)
September 26 – John H. D. Anderson, Scottish natural philosopher (died 1796)

Deaths
March 24 – Daniel Whitby, English theologian (born 1638)
March 26 – Sir John Vanbrugh, English dramatist and architect (born 1664)
April 5 – Ludwig Babenstuber, German theologian and philosopher (born 1660)
April 26 – Jeremy Collier, English theologian and critic (born 1650)
May 20 – Nicholas Brady, Irish poet (born 1659)
July 5 – Domenico Viva, Italian theologian (born 1648)
July 6 – Humfrey Wanley, English librarian and palaeographer (born 1672)
August 12 – Charles Shadwell, English dramatist (year of birth unknown)
December 2 – Samuel Penhallow, English historian (born 1665)
December 11 – Jacques Bouillart, French Benedictine historian (born 1669)

References

 
Years of the 18th century in literature